The Ralliement Mauricien was a political party in Mauritius.

History
The Ralliement Mauricien(RM) party was founded by Jules Koenig in 1953 in preparation for the 1953 General Elections for the Legislative Council. 

It had previously been known as Union Mauricienne which had participated in previous elections. 

After the 1953 elections Jules Koenig changed the name of his party from Ralliement Mauricien to Parti Mauricien. Soon after Gaëtan Duval's succession to Jules Koenig in 1965 he re-branded the same party to Parti Mauricien Social Démocrate (PMSD).

References

Political parties in Mauritius
Communist parties in Mauritius
Socialist parties in Mauritius